Against All Oddz is the first solo album by grime artist Lethal Bizzle. It was released on 15 August 2005.

Track listing

References

2005 debut albums
V2 Records albums
Lethal Bizzle albums